Bernier's vanga (Oriolia bernieri) is a bird species in the family Vangidae. It is in the monotypic genus Oriolia. It is endemic to Madagascar. Its natural habitat is subtropical or tropical moist lowland forests. It is threatened by habitat loss.

References

External links
BirdLife Species Factsheet.

Bernier's vanga
Endemic birds of Madagascar
Bernier's vanga
Taxonomy articles created by Polbot